Dai Yoshioka (吉岡 大, born 14 December 1985) is a Japanese sports shooter. He competed in the men's 25 metre rapid fire pistol event at the 2020 Summer Olympics.

References

External links
 

1985 births
Living people
Japanese male sport shooters
Olympic shooters of Japan
Shooters at the 2020 Summer Olympics
Place of birth missing (living people)